Kārlis Vilciņš (1 November 1892 – 7 May 1972) was a Latvian wrestler. He competed in the Greco-Roman middleweight event at the 1924 Summer Olympics.

References

External links
 

1892 births
1972 deaths
People from Lielvārde Municipality
People from the Governorate of Livonia
Olympic wrestlers of Latvia
Wrestlers at the 1924 Summer Olympics
Latvian male sport wrestlers